Alexandra Rosenfeld (born 23 November 1986) was elected Miss France in 2006. Representing the region of Languedoc, she succeeded Cindy Fabre as the 77th Miss France on 3 December 2005.

Early life and education 
Alexandra Rosenfeld was born in Béziers in the department of Hérault. She has blonde hair and brown eyes and is 5' 8" (1.73 m) tall.

Rosenfeld studied tourism in Pézenas. She has practised athletics since the age of 10 at the athletics club of Pézenas.

Miss France 
Rosenfeld was elected Miss Pays d'Hérault in 2005 and was elected later that year Miss Languedoc-Roussillon. She was then elected Miss France 2006 on 3 December 2005 at Cannes at a television show broadcast on the channel TF1 and hosted by Jean-Pierre Foucault. She succeeded Cindy Fabre and became the 77th Miss France.

Miss Europe 
She was elected Miss Europe 2006 on 27 October in Kyiv, Ukraine. She was the last Miss Europe to have been elected until the contest was revived in 2016.

She represents France at the election of Miss Universe on 23 July 2006.

Television 
Rosenfeld has appeared in a number of television programmes. She was a member of the jury at the election of Miss France 2013. She has also appeared in the adventure show Fort Boyard on France 2 and as the mystery passenger in an episode of the ninth season of the French version of Peking Express on channel M6.

She was a member of the jury on 11 March 2013 in an episode of the French version of Top Chef on M6.

Personal life 
In February 2006, Rosenfeld, who is Jewish, took part in a demonstration against anti-Semitism, which took place after the brutal murder of a young Jew in Paris.

Rosenfeld married Italian rugby player Sergio Parisse on 5 July 2010 at Saint-Thibéry. The couple's first child, a daughter named Ava, was born on 23 August 2010 in Béziers. The godmother is Valérie Bègue. Rosenfeld and Parisse divorced in April 2013. In May 2018 she met the journalist Hugo Clément and fell in love immediately. They moved together to Paris. On 7 July 2019 she announced that she was pregnant with her second child. It is a girl, named Jim, and was born on January 3, 2020.

References

External links
 Official site 

1986 births
Living people
People from Béziers
21st-century French Jews
French people of Spanish-Jewish descent
French people of Hungarian-Jewish descent
Miss France winners
Miss Europe winners
Miss Universe 2006 contestants